The Far West League (FWL) was a collegiate summer baseball league based on the west coast of the United States that serves primarily California and Oregon.  It was formed as part of a merger between the West Coast League/Tri-State and Pacific West Baseball League, even though the PWBL is still in operation.

The FWL began play in 2011 with each team facing each of the other teams three times for 27 regular-season league games.  Post-season play saw the top five teams in a nine-game double-elimination tournament with the Humboldt Crabs winning the 2011 championship.

Teams in the FWL

* = Denotes 2011 FWL Champion

References

External links
 Far West League website (Web Archive)
 Humboldt Crabs website
 Walnut Creek Crawdads website
 Fontanetti's website
 Menlo Park Legends website
 Nor Cal Longhorns website
 San Francisco Seals website
 Neptune Beach Pearl website
 Southern Oregon Riverdawgs website

Summer baseball leagues
2010 establishments in the United States
2013 disestablishments in the United States
Sports leagues established in 2010
Sports leagues disestablished in 2013